
Live Warrior is a live album by Richard Thompson recorded during the 2007 tours of the UK and United States to support the Sweet Warrior album. It is released on Thompson's boutique Beeswing label.

The album's track selection emphasises material from the then recently released Sweet Warrior, with Live Warrior featuring 8 of the 14 tracks from that album.

Track listing
All songs composed by Richard Thompson except Mingulay Boat Song, traditional with additional lyrics by Hugh Robertson

"Needle and Thread"
"Bad Monkey"
"Take Care The Road You Choose"
"Dad's Gonna Kill Me"
"I Still Dream"
"The Wrong Heartbeat"
"I'll Never Give It Up"
"Mingulay Boat Song"
"Guns Are The Tongues"
"A Man In Need"
"A Bone Through Her Nose"
"Read About Love"
"Sunset Song"
"Mr. Stupid"

Personnel
Musicians
Richard Thompson - guitar and vocals
Michael Jerome - drums, percussion and backing vocals
Danny Thompson - double bass (tracks 2, 3, 7, 8, 9, 10, 11, 12, 13)
Taras Prodaniuk - bass guitar (tracks 1, 4, 5, 6, 14)
Pete Zorn - backing vocals, acoustic guitar, mandolin, saxophones and bass flute

Other
 Simon Tassano – FOH sound, Tour manager
 Tom Dubé – Monitors, Production manager
 Bobby Eichorn – Guitar tech, Stage manager
 Edmond Deraedt – Lighting designer – USA
 Paul Kell - Lighting designer - UK

References 
http://www.richardthompson-music.com/

2009 live albums
Richard Thompson (musician) live albums
Self-released albums